Lepidochrysops tantalus, the king blue, is a butterfly of the family Lycaenidae. It is found in South Africa, from the Drakensberg foothills in the Eastern Cape to the KwaZulu-Natal midlands, Eswatini, then along the escarpment hills to Mpumalanga and Gauteng. It is also found in Limpopo.

The wingspan is 30–38 mm for males and 34–40 mm for females. Adults are on wing from September to November. There is one generation per year.

The larvae feed on Becium grandiflorum.

References

Butterflies described in 1887
Lepidochrysops
Butterflies of Africa
Taxa named by Roland Trimen